Jani is a surname, prevalent in the Indian subcontinent

Jyani may refer to:

Surjit Kumar Jyani, politician
Shayam Sundar Jyani, Environmentalist
Jyani, a village on list of villages in Jayal Tehsil
Guru Jasnathji (1484-1506), founder of Sidh Community, was the foster child of Hamirji Jyani